Havetoft is a municipality in Schleswig-Flensburg district, in northern Germany.

References

Municipalities in Schleswig-Holstein
Schleswig-Flensburg